This is a list of fictional characters from the Philippine drama Codename: Asero. The series primarily centers around a man leading two different lives caught between two warring secret agencies: The Advocate and The Empire.

The series began airing on July 14, 2008, replacing Carlo J. Caparas' Joaquin Bordado on its timeslot.

The full characters guide can be found here, provided by iGMA.tv.

Main characters

Secret agencies

The Advocate

The Empire

Extended cast

See also
Codename: Asero
GMA Network

References

Codename: Asero
Codename: Asero